Hieracium scabrum, the rough hawkweed, is a North American plant species in the tribe Cichorieae within the family Asteraceae. It is native to eastern and central Canada and the eastern and central United States from Nova Scotia west to Ontario, Minnesota, and Kansas south as far as Georgia and Oklahoma.

Leaves are mostly on the stem with only a few at the bottom. One stalk can produce 5-50 flower heads in a conical or flat-topped array. Each head has 30-60 yellow ray flowers but no disc flowers. Flowers bloom July to September. It grows in sandy soils, disturbed and wooded sites.

References

External links

Photo of herbarium specimen at Missouri Botanical Garden, collected in Missouri in 1996
Photo by Gerrit Davidse, closeup of flower heads showing hairs on foliage

scabrum
Flora of Canada
Flora of the United States
Plants described in 1803